Conor Hearne (born 1998) is an Irish hurler who plays for Wexford Championship club Shelmaliers and at inter-county level with the Wexford senior hurling team. He usually lines out at midfield.

Career

Hearne first came to hurling prominence at juvenile and underage levels with the Shelmaliers club before eventually joining the club's senior team. His performances during the club's 2020 County Championship-winning season earned him the Wexford Club Hurler of the Year award. Hearne first played at inter-county level with the Wexford minor team during the 2016 Leinster Minor Championship. His performances with DCU Dóchas Éireann during the Fitzgibbon Cup earned his inclusion on the Wexford senior hurling team and he made his debut during the 2021 National Hurling League.

Career statistics

Honours

Shelmaliers
Wexford Senior Hurling Championship: 2020

References

1998 births
Living people
Shelmaliers hurlers
Wexford inter-county hurlers